Into the Woods is the soundtrack album to the 2014 Walt Disney Pictures musical fantasy film of the same name. The album features music written and composed by Stephen Sondheim, and featuring vocals from the film's ensemble cast including Meryl Streep, Emily Blunt, James Corden, Anna Kendrick, Chris Pine, Johnny Depp, Daniel Huttlestone, Lilla Crawford, MacKenzie Mauzy, Tracey Ullman, Christine Baranski, Tammy Blanchard, and Lucy Punch.

Two editions of the soundtrack were released by Walt Disney Records on December 16, 2014: a single-disc traditional edition, and a two-disc digipak deluxe edition. Walt Disney Records subsequently released an instrumental version of the soundtrack on January 15, 2015.

Background
Stephen Sondheim had written a new song for the film, titled "She'll Be Back," written specifically for The Witch. "It was beautiful and spectacular, but it was very clear, as good as the song was, that [the movie] was stronger without.", director Rob Marshall proclaimed. "Rainbows," a song originally written for a film adaption of Into the Woods in the 1990s, was reportedly to be included, although Marshall denied such a claim.

Paul Gemignani and Jonathan Tunick, who conducted and orchestrated (respectively) the original Broadway stage show, returned to conduct and orchestrate the music for the film at Angel Recording Studios in London, with the cast's vocals being recorded separately.

Track listing

Personnel

Jonathan Tunick – orchestrator
Paul Gemignani – music supervisor, conductor
Jim Bruening – assistant music editor
Jennifer Dunnington – music editor
 Mike Higham - music supervisor
Jo Changer – orchestra contractor
Isobel Griffiths – orchestra contractor
Rolf Wilson – orchestra leader

Marc Platt – executive producer
Mitchell Leib – executive in charge of music
Scott Holtzman - music business affairs
Don Welty - music business affairs
Joshua Thomas – assistant engineer
Jason Elliott – assistant engineer
Fred Sladkey – assistant engineer
Anabel Sinn– art direction

Charts

Weekly charts

Year-end charts

References

2014 soundtrack albums
Disney film soundtracks
Walt Disney Records soundtracks
Musical film soundtracks
Fantasy film soundtracks